Gioacchino Volpe (16 February 1876 – 1 October 1971) was an Italian historian and, during the years between the two world wars, a politician.

Biography 
A nationalist, he supported the Fascism and in 1924 was elected deputy with the National List. He was General Secretary of the Royal Academy of Italy from 1929 to 1934 and member of the Accademia dei Lincei  from 1935 to 1946. Between 1924 and 1940 he was professor of modern history at the University of Rome. 

In his works Volpe depicted the history of Italy as a rising process culminated in fascism.  After the Greco-Italian War, his attitude towards fascism gradually became critical and distant.  After the war, he was purged from the university teaching and focused on his studies.

Further reading

References

External links 
 
 

 
 
 

1876 births
1971 deaths
People from the Province of L'Aquila 
20th-century Italian historians
Italian fascists
University of Pisa alumni
Academic staff of the Sapienza University of Rome